Kalvarija Municipality is one of 60 municipalities in Lithuania.

Elderships 
Kalvarija Municipality is divided into 4 elderships:

External links

 
Municipalities of Marijampolė County
Municipalities of Lithuania